Augustus Charles Bickley (1857–1902) was an English journalist and author.

Life
Born in Birmingham, he was the youngest son of Francis Bickley of Carlisle, and brother of Francis Bridges Bickley of the British Museum. Their father died in London, in 1865; as a surgeon and dentist in Carlisle, he had married Harriet Bridges of Lichfield in 1851.

Bickley passed the preliminary examination for Civil Service clerks in 1876. A few years later he was working as a journalist in London.

Works
Bickley wrote over 80 articles for the Dictionary of National Biography, to 1891. He encountered criticism, with his biography of Richard Carpenter (died c.1670) called too close to one written in Biographia Britannia. Other works included:

Archibald Campbell Tait: A Sketch of the Public Life of the Late Archbishop of Canterbury (1882)
George Fox and the Early Quakers (1884)
Bibliographical Notes (1889), editor, vol. IX in The Gentleman's Magazine Library
Midst Surrey Hills: A Rural Story (1890), novel
Handfasted (1890), novel, with George S. Curryer

The Barn at Beccles (1891) was a play co-written with George Hughes.

Family
Bickley married Anna Louisa Ball of Knaphill, Surrey at Woking, on 14 June 1887.

Notes

External links
Online Books page

1857 births
1902 deaths
English journalists
English male novelists
English biographers
Contributors to the Dictionary of National Biography
English male non-fiction writers
Male biographers